Rectory Junction Viaduct, also known as the Radcliffe Viaduct,  crosses the River Trent between Netherfield and Radcliffe on Trent near Nottingham. It is a Grade II listed building.

History
The bridge was built in 1850 by Clayton & Shuttleworth of Lincoln on the Nottingham-Grantham Line for the Ambergate, Nottingham, Boston and Eastern Junction Railway.

The iron arch was formed of six ribs, constructed in eight segments.

The approach viaduct, originally constructed in timber and comprising 32 spans, was rebuilt in brick in 1909-1910 by Alexander Ross. The brick viaduct comprises 28 spans, eighteen are 24 ft 11 ins, and ten are 25 ft 7 ins.

The internal cast iron ribs were encased in concrete by British Rail in 1981 to increase the strength of the bridge, but the original cast iron ribs on the exterior were left exposed, leaving the bridge appearance little changed.

See also
List of crossings of the River Trent

References

Railway viaducts in Nottinghamshire
Bridges across the River Trent
Bridges completed in 1850
Grade II listed bridges
Grade II listed buildings in Nottinghamshire
Radcliffe on Trent